This is a list of U.S. Virgin Islands locations by per capita income. In the 2010 U.S. Census, the U.S. Virgin Islands had a per capita income of $21,362 and a median household income of $37,254.

U.S. Virgin Islands counties ranked by per capita income

Note: The U.S. Virgin Islands does not have counties. The U.S. Census Bureau counts each of the 3 main islands of the U.S. Virgin Islands as county-equivalents.

U.S. Virgin Islands sub-districts ranked by per capita income

The U.S. Census Bureau divides the 3 islands of the U.S. Virgin Islands into 20 statistical sub-districts. This is a list of the sub-districts ranked by per capita income (2010 U.S. Census).

References

United States locations by per capita income
Economy of the United States Virgin Islands